Hoplopyga is a genus of beetles of the family Scarabaeidae. These beetles can be found in Central and South America.

Species
 Hoplopyga albiventris (Gory & Percheron, 1833)
 Hoplopyga boliviensis Moser, 1918
 Hoplopyga brasiliensis  (Gory & Percheron, 1833)
 Hoplopyga cerdani Antoine, 1998
 Hoplopyga foeda (Schaum, 1848)
 Hoplopyga gosseti Antoine, 2008
 Hoplopyga liturata (Olivier, 1789)
 Hoplopyga lucidiventris (Thomson, 1878)
 Hoplopyga lugubris (Thomson, 1878)
 Hoplopyga marginesignata  (Gory & Percheron, 1833)
 Hoplopyga miliaris  (Gory & Percheron, 1833)
 Hoplopyga miniata (Blanchard, 1846)
 Hoplopyga monacha  (Gory & Percheron, 1833)
 Hoplopyga multipunctata  (Gory & Percheron, 1833)
 Hoplopyga ocellata  (Gory & Percheron, 1833)
 Hoplopyga peruana Moser, 1912
 Hoplopyga ravida Janson, 1881
 Hoplopyga rubida  (Gory & Percheron, 1833)
 Hoplopyga ruteri Antoine, 2008
 Hoplopyga singularis  (Gory & Percheron, 1833)
 Hoplopyga spurca Janson, 1881
 Hoplopyga suilla Janson, 1881

References

Scarabaeidae